Arnulf of Milan (  1085) was a medieval chronicler of northern Italy.

Arnulf of Milan may also refer to:

Arnulf I (archbishop of Milan)
Arnulf II (archbishop of Milan)
Arnulf III (archbishop of Milan)